Beni is a municipality and the district headquarters of Myagdi District in Dhaulagiri Zone, Nepal. Municipality was announced by merging the then Ratnechaur, Jyamrukot, Arthunge, Ghatan, Pulachaur, Singa village development committees since 18 May 2014.

Beni is located at the confluence of the Kali Gandaki River and Myagdi River at an altitude of 899 meters. Being the northernmost of the Tri-cities area of Nepal, it is located 12 km to the north of Zonal headquarters Baglung. It is mainly divided into two parts by the Kali Gandaki River. The Western Part lies in Myagdi District and the main offices lie there. The other part lies in Parbat District and is relatively small.

History
Beni meaning the place where two rivers meet was the winter headquarters of Parvat Rajya. It was on the Tibet-Nepal trading route before the invasion of Parvat Rajya.

Education 
Beni municipality has many private, community as well as government schools. Some of them are as follows.

 Beni Community Higher Secondary School
 West point College
 Beni Boarding Secondary School
 Prakash Higher Secondary School, Beni
 Little Garden Academy
 Shree Ramchandra Secondary School
 Mount Everest Secondary School
 Shree Galeshwor Higher Secondary School
 Dhawalagiri Secondary High School
 Shree Arjun Secondary School
 Bhanu Higher Secondary School
 Shree Paulastya Higher Secondary School
 Lokdeep Secondary Boarding School
 Rastriya Secondary School
 Shree Jayanti Secondary School
 Shree Musung Dhole Aadarbhut School
 Deep Shikha Higher Secondary School
 Jamunakharka Higher Secondary School

Tourist Attraction 

Although Beni is small but it is really beautiful. Some of the popular tourist destinations are:

 Kaligandaki Rafting
 Galeshwor Temple
 Lovely Hill
 Myagdi River Rafting
 Gateway of Mustang

Pictures

See also
 2004 Beni attack

References

External links
UN map of the municipalities of Myagdi District
Municipalities in Nepal: their Websites, Official Facebook Page & ICT

Populated places in Myagdi District
Nepal municipalities established in 2014
Municipalities in Gandaki Province